Darvoy is a commune in the Loiret department in north-central France.

Etymology 

Darvoy likely comes from the Celtic Der or Dervos (oak), or Dervetum (oak).

Geography 

Darvoy is in the Loire Valley, 17 km east of Orléans, 2 km south-west of Jargeau, and 122 km south of Paris. Darvoy is part of the Central Region and is part of the Jargeau canton. Darvoy is 101 meters above sea level.

See also
Communes of the Loiret department

References 

Communes of Loiret